Three Comrades is a 1935 Soviet drama film directed by Semyon Timoshenko.

Plot 
The new chief of construction Zaitsev visits a small town in which his friends work (director of the paper factory Glinka and chief of the timber merchant Latsis). Zaitsev will paint himself as a group of rascals to expand the factory.

Starring 
 Mikhail Zharov	as Zaitsev
 Anatoly Goryunov as Glinka
 Tatyana Guretskaya as Varya, Glinka's wife
 Nikolai Batalov as Latsis
 Nikolai Michurin as hustler
 Veronika Polonskaya as Irina, Latsis's wife
 Valeri Solovtsov as Gubenko

References

External links 
 
 

1935 drama films
1935 films
Films scored by Isaak Dunayevsky
1930s Russian-language films
Soviet black-and-white films
Soviet drama films